INT 13h is shorthand for BIOS interrupt call 13hex, the 20th interrupt vector in an x86-based (IBM PC-descended) computer system. The BIOS typically sets up a real mode interrupt handler at this vector that provides sector-based hard disk and floppy disk read and write services using cylinder-head-sector (CHS) addressing. Modern PC BIOSes also include INT 13h extension functions, originated by IBM and Microsoft in 1992, that provide those same disk access services using 64-bit LBA addressing; with minor additions, these were quasi-standardized by Phoenix Technologies and others as the EDD (Enhanced Disk Drive) BIOS extensions.

INT is an x86 instruction that triggers a software interrupt, and 13hex is the interrupt number (as a hexadecimal value) being called.

Modern computers come with both BIOS INT 13h and UEFI functionality that provides the same services and more, with the exception of UEFI Class 3 that completely removes CSM thus lacks INT 13h and other interrupts. Typically, UEFI drivers use LBA-addressing instead of CHS-addressing.

Overview 

Under real mode operating systems, such as DOS, calling INT 13h would jump into the computer's ROM-BIOS code for low-level disk services, which would carry out physical sector-based disk read or write operations for the program. In DOS, it serves as the low-level interface for the built-in block device drivers for hard disks and floppy disks. This allows INT 25h and INT 26h to provide absolute disk read/write functions for logical sectors to the FAT file system driver in the DOS kernel, which handles file-related requests through DOS API (INT 21h) functions.

Under protected mode operating systems, such as Microsoft Windows NT derivatives (e.g. NT4, 2000, XP, and Server 2003) and Linux with dosemu, the OS intercepts the call and passes it to the operating system's native disk I/O mechanism. Windows 9x and Windows for Workgroups 3.11 also bypass BIOS routines when using 32-bit Disk Access. Besides performing low-level disk access, INT 13h calls and related BIOS data structures also provide information about the types and capacities of disks (or other DASD devices) attached to the system; when a protected-mode OS boots, it may use that information from the BIOS to enumerate disk hardware so that it (the OS) can load and configure appropriate disk I/O drivers.

The original BIOS real-mode INT 13h interface supports drives of sizes up to about 8 GB using what is commonly referred to as physical CHS addressing. This limit originates from the hardware interface of the IBM PC/XT disk hardware. The BIOS used the cylinder-head-sector (CHS) address given in the INT 13h call, and transferred it directly to the hardware interface. A lesser limit, about 504 MB, was imposed by the combination of CHS addressing limits used by the BIOS and those used by ATA hard disks, which are dissimilar.  When the CHS addressing limits of both the BIOS and ATA are combined (i.e. when they are applied simultaneously), the number of 512-byte sectors that can be addressed represent a total of about 504 MB.

The 504 MB limit was overcome using CHS translation, a technique by which the BIOS would simulate a fictitious CHS geometry at the INT 13h interface, while communicating with the ATA drive using its native logical CHS geometry.  (By the time the 504 MB barrier was being approached, ATA disks had long before ceased to present their real physical geometry parameters at the external ATA interface.)  Translation allows the BIOS, still using CHS addressing, to effectively address ATA disks with sizes up to exactly 8064 MB, the native capacity of the BIOS CHS interface alone.  (The ATA interface has a much larger native CHS addressing capacity, so once the "interference" of the CHS limits of BIOS and ATA was resolved by addressing, only the smaller limitation of the BIOS was significant.)  CHS translation is sometimes referred to as logical CHS addressing, but that is actually a misnomer since by the time of this BIOS development, ATA CHS addresses were already logical, not physical.  The 8064 MB limit originates from a combination of the register value based calling convention used in the INT 13h interface and the goal of maintaining backward compatibility—dictating that the format or size of CHS addresses passed to INT 13h could not be changed to add more bits to one of the fields, e.g. the Cylinder-number field. This limit uses 1024 cylinders, 256 heads, 63 sectors, and 512 byte blocks, allowing exactly 7.875 GiB of addressing (1024 * 256 * 63 * 512 bytes). There were briefly a number of BIOSes that offered incompatible versions of this interface—for example, AWARD AT BIOS and AMI 386sx BIOS have been extended to handle up to 4096 cylinders by placing bits 10 and 11 of the cylinder number into bits 6 and 7 of register DH.

All versions of MS-DOS, (including MS-DOS 7 and Windows 95) have a bug which prevents booting disk drives with 256 heads (register value 0xFF), so many modern BIOSes provide CHS translation mappings with at most 255 (0xFE) heads, thus reducing the total addressable space to exactly 8032.5 MiB (approx 7.844 GiB).

To support addressing of even larger disks, an interface known as INT 13h Extensions was introduced by IBM and Microsoft, then later re-published and slightly extended by Phoenix Technologies as part of BIOS Enhanced Disk Drive Services (EDD). It defines new functions within the INT 13h service, all having function numbers greater than 40h, that use 64-bit logical block addressing (LBA), which allows addressing up to 8 ZiB. (An ATA drive can also support 28-bit or 48-bit LBA which allows up to 128 GiB or 128 PiB respectively, assuming a 512-byte sector/block size). This is a "packet" interface, because it uses a pointer to a packet of information rather than the register based calling convention of the original INT 13h interface. This packet is a very simple data structure that contains an interface version, data size, and LBAs. For software backward-compatibility, the extended functions are implemented alongside the original CHS functions, and calls to functions from both sets can be intermixed, even for the same drive, with the caveat that the CHS functions cannot reach past the first 8064 MB of the disk.

Some cache drivers flush their buffers when detecting that DOS is bypassed by directly issuing INT 13h from applications. A dummy read via INT 13h can be used as one of several methods to force cache flushing for unknown caches (e.g. before rebooting).

AMI BIOSes from around 1990–1991 trash word unaligned buffers. 
Some DOS and terminate-and-stay-resident programs clobber interrupt enabling and registers so PC DOS and MS-DOS install their own filters to prevent this.

List of  services 

If the second column is empty then the function may be used both for floppy and hard disk.
 FD: for floppy disk only.
 HD: for hard disk only.
 PS/2: for hard disk on PS/2 system only.
 EXT: part of the  Extensions which were written in the 1990s to support hard drives with more than 8 GB.

: Reset Disk System

: Get Status of Last Drive Operation

Bit 7=0 for floppy drive, bit 7=1 for fixed drive

: Read Sectors From Drive

Remarks
Register CX contains both the cylinder number (10 bits, possible values are 0 to 1023)
and the sector number (6 bits, possible values are 1 to 63). Cylinder and Sector bits are numbered below:
 CX =       ---CH--- ---CL---
 cylinder : 76543210 98
 sector   :            543210
Examples of translation:
 CX := ( ( cylinder and 255 ) shl 8 ) or ( ( cylinder and 768 ) shr 2 ) or sector;
 cylinder := ( (CX and 0xFF00) shr 8 ) or ( (CX and 0xC0) shl 2)
 sector := CX and 63;

Addressing of Buffer should guarantee that the complete buffer is inside the given segment,
i.e. ( BX + size_of_buffer ) <= 10000h.
Otherwise the interrupt may fail with some BIOS or hardware versions.

Example
Assume you want to read 16 sectors (= 2000h bytes) and your buffer starts
at memory address 4FF00h. Utilizing memory segmentation, there are different ways to calculate the register values, e.g.:
 ES = segment         = 4F00h
 BX = offset          =  0F00h
 sum = memory address = 4FF00h
 would be a good choice because 0F00h + 2000h = 2F00h <= 10000h
 ES = segment         = 4000h
 BX = offset          =  FF00h
 sum = memory address = 4FF00h
 would not be a good choice because FF00h + 2000h = 11F00h > 10000h

Function 02h of interrupt 13h may only read sectors of the first 16,450,560 sectors
of your hard drive, to read sectors beyond the 8 GB limit you should use function 42h
of  Extensions. Another alternate may be DOS interrupt 25h which reads sectors
within a partition.

Code Example 

    [ORG 7c00h]   ; code starts at 7c00h
    xor ax, ax    ; make sure ds is set to 0
    mov ds, ax
    cld
    ; start putting in values:
    mov ah, 2h    ; int13h function 2
    mov al, 63    ; we want to read 63 sectors
    mov ch, 0     ; from cylinder number 0
    mov cl, 2     ; the sector number 2 - second sector (starts from 1, not 0)
    mov dh, 0     ; head number 0
    xor bx, bx    
    mov es, bx    ; es should be 0
    mov bx, 7e00h ; 512bytes from origin address 7c00h
    int 13h
    jmp 7e00h     ; jump to the next sector
    
    ; to fill this sector and make it bootable:
    times 510-($-$$) db 0 
    dw 0AA55h

After this code section (which the asm file should start with), you may write code and it will be loaded to memory and executed.

Notice how we didn't change dl (the drive). That is because when the computer first loads up, dl is set to the number of the drive that was booted, so assuming we want to read from the drive we booted from, there is no need to change dl.

: Write Sectors To Drive

: Verify Sectors From Drive

: Format Track

: Format Track Set Bad Sector Flags

: Format Drive Starting at Track

: Read Drive Parameters

Remarks
 Logical values of function 08h may/should differ from physical CHS values of function 48h.
 Result register CX contains both cylinders and sector/track values, see remark of function 02h.

: Init Drive Pair Characteristics

AH=0Ah: Read Long Sectors From Drive
The only difference between this function and function 02h (see above) is that function 0Ah reads 516 bytes per sector
instead of only 512. The last 4 bytes contains the Error Correction Code (ECC), a checksum of sector data.

: Check Extensions Present

: Extended Read Sectors From Drive

As already stated with int 13h AH=02h, care must be taken to ensure that the complete buffer is inside the given segment, i.e. ( BX + size_of_buffer ) <= 10000h

: Extended Write Sectors to Drive

: Extended Read Drive Parameters

Remark
Physical CHS values of function 48h may/should differ from logical values of function 08h.

INT 13h AH=4Bh: Get Drive Emulation Type

See also 
 INT 10H
 BIOS interrupt call
 Cylinder-head-sector
 INT (x86 instruction)
 DPMI (DOS Protected Mode Interface)
 Ralf Brown's Interrupt List
BIOS Enhanced Disk Drive Specification

References

External links 
 BIOS Interrupt 13h Extensions
 Ralf Brown's comprehensive Interrupt List
 Norton Guide about int 13h, ah = 00h .. 1ah

IBM PC compatibles
BIOS
Interrupts